Dagsnytt (Norwegian: "daily news") is Norwegian public radio's main news programme. It is broadcast on most of NRK radio channels, with bulletins every hour and longer programmes four times a day (06:30, 07:30, 12:30 and 17:30). It has about 2,5 million daily listeners, around half of the Norwegian population.

First broadcast in 1934, Dagsnytt is the oldest and most recognized of all NRK programmes.

The programme is produced by NRK's news division, based at Television House at NRK headquarters at Marienlyst in Oslo.

See also
 Dagsnytt Atten
 NRK News

External links
https://web.archive.org/web/20070824175730/http://www.nrk.no/dagsnytt/

Norwegian radio programs
1934 radio programme debuts
NRK radio programs
News radio programs